Finlay Macrae (born 13 March 2002) is an Australian rules footballer who currently plays with the Collingwood Football Club in the Australian Football League. He is the younger brother of Western Bulldogs player Jack Macrae, and was educated at Xavier College.

Macrae made his debut in round 5, 2021, against the West Coast Eagles.

Statistics
Updated to the end of the 2022 season.

|-
| 2021 ||  || 18
| 9 || 1 || 0 || 45 || 69 || 114 || 26 || 9 || 0.1 || 0.0 || 5.0 || 7.7 || 12.7 || 2.9 || 1.0
|-
| 2022 ||  || 18
| 2 || 0 || 0 || 6 || 9 || 15 || 1 || 2 || 0.0 || 0.0 || 3.0 || 4.5 || 7.5 || 0.5 || 1.0
|- class=sortbottom
! colspan=3 | Career
! 11 !! 1 !! 0 !! 51 !! 78 !! 129 !! 27 !! 11 !! 0.1 !! 0.0 !! 4.6 !! 7.1 !! 11.7 !! 2.5 !! 1.0
|}

References

External links

2002 births
Living people
Collingwood Football Club players
People educated at Xavier College
Australian rules footballers from Victoria (Australia)